Decatur County Courthouse is a historic county courthouse in Bainbridge, Georgia, the county seat of Decatur County, Georgia. The Neoclassical building was designed by Alexander Blair III and built in 1902. It was added to the National Register of Historic Places on September 18, 1980. It is located on West Street and Water Street.

See also

National Register of Historic Places listings in Decatur County, Georgia

References

External links
 

Courthouses on the National Register of Historic Places in Georgia (U.S. state)
Buildings and structures in Decatur County, Georgia
County courthouses in Georgia (U.S. state)
Government buildings completed in 1902
Neoclassical architecture in Georgia (U.S. state)
Clock towers in Georgia (U.S. state)
National Register of Historic Places in Decatur County, Georgia